WWOV-LP is a Classic Country, Country Gospel, Southern Gospel, and Bluegrass formatted broadcast radio station licensed to Martins Ferry, Ohio, serving Bridgeport, Ohio and Wheeling, West Virginia.  WWOV-LP is owned and operated by Wheeling Jamboree, Inc.

References

External links
 101.1 WWOV Online
 

2014 establishments in Ohio
Classic country radio stations in the United States
Southern Gospel radio stations in the United States
Radio stations established in 2014
WOV-LP
WOV-LP